San Giovanni Battista is a Romanesque-style, Roman Catholic pieve, or rural parish church with baptistery, located in the village of Mensano, in the comune of Casole d'Elsa, Tuscany, Italy.

History
A church at the site is documented in a papal bull of Pope Alexander III since 1171. Inscriptions uncovered in the three nave church attributed work of maestro Buonamico in the construction. Traces of 13th-century frescoes are present.

References

12th-century Roman Catholic church buildings in Italy
Romanesque architecture in Tuscany
Churches in the province of Siena